The 1935–36 New York Americans season was the Americans' 11th season of play. Under coach Rosie Helmer, the team improved to third place in the Canadian Division and qualified for the playoffs, for only the second time in the team's history. The club won its quarter-final series against the Chicago Black Hawks, before losing in the semi-final to the Toronto Maple Leafs.

Regular season

Final standings

Record vs. opponents

Game log

Playoffs
The Americans made it into the playoffs for the second time in history.  They defeated Chicago 7 goals to 5, or 7–5.  They went against Toronto in the second round in a best of three series and lost in 3 games, or 1–2.

Player stats

Regular season
Scoring

Goaltending

Playoffs
Scoring

Goaltending

See also
1935–36 NHL season

References

External links
 

New York Americans seasons
New York Americans
New York Americans
New York Amer
New York Amer
1930s in Manhattan
Madison Square Garden